Vincent Borg Bonaci (born 11 December 1943) is a Maltese former professional footballer.

International career
He was a member of the Malta national football team from 1969 to 1972.

External links

1943 births
Living people
Malta international footballers
Maltese footballers
Association football goalkeepers